Adam Jentleson is an American writer and political commentator.

Early life 
Jentleson is the son of Bruce Jentleson, professor at Duke University and former director of the Sanford School of Public Policy.

Education 
Jentleson received a BA in American History from Columbia University in 2003.

Career 
 
Jentleson began his career as a policy researcher and speechwriter for the John Kerry 2004 presidential campaign. He then served as Manager of Congressional Affairs at the Center for American Progress, speechwriter for the 2008 presidential campaign of John Edwards. 

Jentleson served as communications director and later, deputy chief of staff, for United States Senator Harry Reid from 2010 to 2016. The New York Times published his essay, "The Side of Harry Reid Most People Never Saw" the day after Senator Reid's passing on December 28, 2021.

Jentleson is a columnist for GQ, Jentleson has also contributed commentary to The New York Times, Politico magazine, and The Washington Post. His book, Kill Switch: The Rise of the Modern Senate and the Crippling of American Democracy, provides an extensive critique of the United States Senate, particularly the rise of the filibuster during the 19th century and 20th century to slow the advancement of civil rights legislation for American minorities, particularly African Americans.

In mid-November 2022, Pennsylvania's newly elected U.S. Senator John Fetterman announced the appointment of Jettleson as transition committee co-chair and, a few weeks later, in early December, named Jentleson as his chief of staff.

Book 
 Kill Switch: The Rise of the Modern Senate and the Crippling of American Democracy [2021] New York, NY Liveright Publishing Corporation, a division of W. W. Norton & Company,

References

Year of birth missing (living people)
Living people
21st-century American male writers
Columbia College (New York) alumni